The Rhine-Westerwald Nature Park is a nature park in Germany that covers an area of around 470 km2 to the east of the River Rhine and in the north of the state of Rhineland-Palatinate between Neuwied and Unkel. It extends from the Rhine over its eastern bank terraces up to the first hill ridge of the Lower Westerwald. The Rhine-Westerwald Nature Park is over 50 years old, making it the oldest one in Germany. It was founded in 1962 and celebrated its 50th anniversary in 2012. Its legal owner is the society of Naturpark Rhein-Westerwald.

Location 
The nature park covers parts of the counties of Neuwied and Altenkirchen. The following municipalities and boroughs lie within the nature park:
 Asbach,
 Bad Hönningen, 
 Dierdorf,
 Flammersfeld,
 Linz am Rhein, 
 Stadt Neuwied,
 Puderbach,
 Rengsdorf,
 Unkel, 
 Waldbreitbach.

See also 
 List of nature parks in Germany

References

External links 
 
 Rhine-Westerwald Nature Park 
 The nature park at naturparke.de

Rhine-Westerwald
Geography of the Westerwald
Neuwied (district)
Altenkirchen (district)